Shane Kenward (born 7 March 1972) is a former professional rugby league footballer who played in the 1990s and 2000s.

References

1972 births
Living people
Australian rugby league players
Canberra Raiders players
Gold Coast Chargers players
Gold Coast Chargers
North Queensland Cowboys players
Place of birth missing (living people)
Rugby league centres
Rugby league five-eighths
Rugby league fullbacks
Salford Red Devils players
St. George Dragons players
Wakefield Trinity players